Alfred Lee Wyman (December 9, 1874 – December 15, 1953) was a United States district judge of the United States District Court for the District of South Dakota.

Education and career

Born in Yankton, Dakota Territory (State of South Dakota from November 2, 1889), Wyman read law in 1896 to enter the Bar, and was in private practice in Yankton intermittently from 1896 until 1929. He was state's attorney of Yankton County from 1905 to 1908 and again from 1915 to 1918. He was city attorney of Yankton from 1909 to 1914. He was a member of the South Dakota House of Representatives in 1909, and of the South Dakota Senate in 1911. He was the Mayor of Yankton from 1914 to 1924.

Federal judicial service

On April 18, 1929, Wyman was nominated by President Herbert Hoover to a new seat on the United States District Court for the District of South Dakota created by 45 Stat. 1317. He was confirmed by the United States Senate on May 10, 1929, and received his commission the same day. On December 9, 1953, President Dwight D. Eisenhower certified Wyman involuntarily as disabled in accordance with the act of October 31, 1951, 65 Stat. 710, which entitled the President to appoint an additional judge for the court and provided that no successor to the judge certified as disabled be appointed. George Theodore Mickelson was appointed to the additional judgeship. Wyman died six days later on December 15, 1953.

References

Sources
 

1874 births
1953 deaths
Judges of the United States District Court for the District of South Dakota
United States district court judges appointed by Herbert Hoover
20th-century American judges
Members of the South Dakota House of Representatives
South Dakota state senators
Mayors of places in South Dakota
People from Yankton, South Dakota
United States federal judges admitted to the practice of law by reading law